Alex Jacob Howes (born 6 January 2000) is an English footballer who plays for Basford United, where he plays as a midfielder. Howes started his young career at Notts County at age 9, working his way through the youth set up, until he was released at the age of 20, after making 5 senior appearances for the club.

Playing career

Notts County
Howes was first called up to the Notts County senior squad in March 2017, being selected for the bench against Hartlepool United by player-manager Kevin Nolan. He made his professional debut in a 3–1 victory over Colchester United on 1 April 2017, coming on as a substitute for Jon Stead. He made his first start for Notts County on 6 May 2017, the final day of the 2016-17 season, in a 2–1 away loss at Newport County, where he played 58 minutes before being replaced by Alan Smith.

Coalville Town (loan)
In November, 2017, Howes was loaned to Northern Premier League side Coalville Town. He scored his first goal for the club against Stamford in a 5–1 cup victory. Howes made a total of 26 appearances, scoring 9 goals in a successful loan spell with the club.

Tamworth (loan)
Howes joined Southern League Premier Division Central side Tamworth on a one-month loan deal on 16 August 2019. He made his debut for the following day, in a home Southern League Premier Division Central match against Peterborough Sports, coming on as a 69th minute substitute for James Fry. He went onto make 3 more appearances for the club in a month loan spell.

Basford United
On 9 August, 2020 Howe joined Northern Premier League side Basford United following his release from Notts County.

Career statistics

Notes

References

External links
 

Living people
2000 births
English footballers
English Football League players
Association football midfielders
Footballers from Nottingham
Notts County F.C. players
Coalville Town F.C. players
Tamworth F.C. players
Basford United F.C. players